Testosterone propionate/testosterone phenylpropionate/testosterone isocaproate (TP/TPP/TiC), sold under the brand name Sustanon 100 (Organon), is an injectable combination medication of four testosterone esters, all of which are androgens/anabolic steroids. They include:

 20 mg testosterone propionate
 40 mg testosterone phenylpropionate
 40 mg testosterone isocaproate

They are provided as an oil solution and are administered by intramuscular injection. The different testosterone esters provide for different elimination half-lives in the body. Esterification of testosterone provides for a sustained but non-linear release of testosterone hormone from the injection depot into the circulation.

The medication was a smaller dose than Sustanon 250 and was usually reserved for pediatric use.

Sustanon 100 has not been produced since 2009. Sustanon 100 is manufactured in India by Zydus.

See also
 Testosterone propionate/testosterone phenylpropionate/testosterone isocaproate/testosterone decanoate
 Testosterone propionate/testosterone phenylpropionate/testosterone isocaproate/testosterone caproate
 List of combined sex-hormonal preparations § Androgens

References

Abandoned drugs
Androgens and anabolic steroids
Androstanes
Combined androgen formulations
Prodrugs
Testosterone